The British Academy Video Games Award for Best Game is an award presented annually by the British Academy of Film and Television Arts (BAFTA). It is given in honor of "the best game of the year, across all genres and platforms". The 1st British Academy Video Games Awards ceremony was held in 2004, with Infinity Ward and Activision's game Call of Duty receiving the award. The award was originally known as Game of the Year – The Year's Best Game for the 2004 ceremony.

Since its inception, the award has been given to eighteen games. As developers, Valve and Naughty Dog have received the most awards in this category, with two wins, while Sony Interactive Entertainment are the most awarded publishers in this category, with five wins. Nintendo's Entertainment Analysis & Development division were nominated on six occasions, more than any other developer; and Sony are the most nominated publisher, with sixteen nominations. As of 2022 an Indie game has won the award three times, What Remains of Edith Finch in 2017, Outer Wilds in 2019, and Hades in 2020.

The most recent winner of the award is Returnal by developer Housemarque and publisher Sony Interactive Entertainment, which received the award at the 2022 ceremony.

Winners and nominees
In the following table, the years are listed as per BAFTA convention, and generally correspond to the year of game release in the United Kingdom.

Multiple nominations and wins

Developers

Publishers

Notes

References

External links
Official website

Best Game
Awards for best video game